The Presidium of the Bundestag is responsible for the routine administration of the Bundestag, including its clerical and research activities. The presidium consists of the President of the Bundestag and a variable number of Vice Presidents, currently six.

Composition

The presidium is elected by the Bundestag during its first meeting after an election; by tradition, the largest faction in the Bundestag has the right to nominate a candidate for the post of president. On the first two ballots, a nominee needs a majority of all Bundestag members (Chancellor majority) in order to be elected; on the third ballot a plurality (more yes- than no-votes) is sufficient. His or her term ends with the end of the legislature, but they can be re-elected, as long as he or she is re-elected as member of the Bundestag.

Besides the president, the presidium also consists of a varying number of vice presidents, who are also elected during the first session of each legislative period. Since 1994, the Bundestag's standing rules state that the minimum number of vice presidents has to equal the number of factions and give every faction the right to nominate one vice president. Nevertheless, like the president, each vice president has to be elected by a majority of the whole house on the first two or a plurality on the third ballot; this can result (and already has) in the outcome that the actual number of sitting vice presidents does not equal the number of factions, if a faction does not succeed in naming a candidate, who is acceptable to at least the necessary majority. The Bundestag may decide to elect additional vice presidents. For example, in the 18th Bundestag (2013–2017), which only consisted of four factions, the two biggest factions (CDU/CSU and SPD) were each entitled to nominate a second vice president, as a presidium of only five persons was considered too small to fulfill its tasks.

1st Bundestag (1949−1953)

2nd Bundestag (1953−1957)

3rd Bundestag (1957−1961)

4th Bundestag (1961−1965)

5th Bundestag (1965–1969)

6th Bundestag (1969−1972)

7th Bundestag (1972−1976)

8th Bundestag (1976−1980)

9th Bundestag (1980−1983)

10th Bundestag (1983−1987)

11th Bundestag (1987−1990)

12th Bundestag (1990−1994)

13th Bundestag (1994−1998)

Hans Klein died on 26 November 1996. On 16 January 1997, Michaela Geiger was elected to the vacant post.

14th Bundestag (1998−2002)

15th Bundestag (2002−2005)

16th Bundestag (2005−2009)

17th Bundestag (2009−2013)

18th Bundestag (2013−2017)

The CDU/CSU's second Vice President Peter Hintze died on 26 November 2016. On 19 January 2017, Michaela Noll was elected to the vacant post.

19th Bundestag (2017–2021)

The SPD's Vice President Thomas Oppermann died on 25 October 2020, Dagmar Ziegler was elected to the vacant post.

The AfD was represented in the 19th Bundestag with group status and had the right to nominate a vice president. However, no proposed candidate achieved the necessary majority during the entire legislative period.

20th Bundestag (2021–)

Claudia Roth resigned her post as vice president on 8 December 2021 upon entering office as State Minister and Federal Commissioner for Culture and the Media. Katrin Göring-Eckardt, who already served as vice president in the 16th and 17th Bundestag, was elected to the post one day later, on 9 December 2021.

The AfD is represented in the 20th Bundestag with group status and has the right to nominate a vice president. However, as yet, no proposed candidate has achieved the necessary majority.

References

External links
Rulers.org
Parlamentarierportal | Deutscher Bundestag
Presidium of the Bundestag

Bundestag
Bundestag
Chairs of lower houses
Presiding bodies of legislatures